Embracer Group AB (formerly Nordic Games Licensing AB and THQ Nordic AB) is a Swedish video game and media holding company based in Karlstad. The company was established under the name Nordic Games Licensing in 2011 as part of Nordic Games Group and as the parent of publisher Nordic Games GmbH.

The company has acquired several assets from defunct publishers, beginning with those of JoWooD in 2011 and THQ in 2013. In August 2016, Nordic Games Licensing and its publishing subsidiary changed their names to THQ Nordic AB and THQ Nordic GmbH, utilising the "THQ" trademark that it had acquired in 2014. In November 2016, it became a public company listed on Nasdaq First North. Throughout 2018, THQ Nordic acquired Koch Media Holding (parent of Koch Media) and Coffee Stain Holding (parent of Coffee Stain Studios), both of which became independently operating groups within THQ Nordic, complementary to THQ Nordic GmbH. To avoid confusion with THQ Nordic GmbH and to clarify its position as a holding company, THQ Nordic AB was renamed as Embracer Group in September 2019, while THQ Nordic GmbH retained its name.

, Embracer Group has twelve operative groups as its direct subsidiaries: Amplifier Game Invest, Asmodee, CDE Entertainment, Coffee Stain Holding, Dark Horse Media, DECA Games, Easybrain, Embracer Freemode, Gearbox Entertainment, Plaion, Saber Interactive, and THQ Nordic. Each group has its own operations, subsidiaries and development studios.

History

The original Nordic Games (1990s–2004) 
At an early age, Swedish entrepreneur Lars Wingefors began successfully selling a diverse range of products, including Christmas magazines and plastic bags, and when he was 13 years old, he founded LW Comics, a company that sold second-hand comic books. He established the business as a mail order company using a 2,000-entry customer register he had acquired from another, defunct mail order company. The company made close to  annually. At age 16, Wingefors established a second company, Nordic Games, which did the same as LW Comics, though with used video games instead of comics. In its first year, the company generated  in revenue. With growing income throughout the 1990s, Nordic Games was turned into a retail chain—in the same vein as British video game retail company Game—and opened seven stores across Sweden. The company also acquired Spel- & Tele shopen, a game shop in Linköping, Sweden, that had been founded by Pelle Lundborg four years prior.

Under Gameplay, Nordic Games failed to generate much revenue; the company tried to establish mobile game, digital distribution and cable TV box businesses, all of which did not gain traction. Wingefors brought in venture capitalists and reformed the company to only sell newly released games, but the company faced strong competition and finally filed for bankruptcy in 2004.

The new Nordic Games (2004–2011) 
Wingefors invested the money he had left into a new limited company and, together with potential customers acting as investors, reformed Nordic Games under the name Game Outlet Europe. The new company saw success with purchasing unsold stock from larger video game companies, such as Electronic Arts, repackaging them on pallets in its Karlstad headquarters, and selling them on the international market and through other retail chains, such as Jula, Coop, and ICA. In December 2008, a new company with the name Nordic Games Publishing was established as the video game publishing subsidiary of Game Outlet Europe. The subsidiary started out with seven people, including primary shareholder Wingefors, based in Karlstad, and chief executive officer Lundborg, who had since moved to Málaga with his wife. Nik Blower in London was added to the management team in February 2010.

The idea behind Nordic Games Publishing was to invest in the development of games that would fill gaps in the video game market; Wingefors and Lundborg had noticed that the line-up of games for Nintendo platforms was lacking karaoke games similar to SingStar, which was exclusive to PlayStation consoles. Based on 100-page requirement documents from Nintendo, which included that the game's microphones should be produced by Logitech, and four months of research at a karaoke bar in Watford, England, Nordic Games Publishing assembled a song list for the game and started producing what would later become We Sing. Around this time, Nordic Games Publishing also released Dance Party Club Hits, a dance game that came packaged with a dancing mat. By March 2011, Nordic Games Holding had been established as a holding company, with Game Outlet Europe and Nordic Games Publishing aligned as its subsidiaries.

International expansion (2011–2018) 

In June 2011, Nordic Games Holding acquired the assets of insolvent publisher JoWooD Entertainment and its subsidiaries. The acquired assets were transferred to Nordic Games GmbH, a newly established subsidiary office in Vienna, Austria. Several former JoWooD employees were hired by Nordic Games GmbH to work on backlog sales of former JoWooD properties, and Nordic Games Publishing was integrated into Nordic Games GmbH to facilitate operations. Nordic Games Licensing AB, also established in 2011, became the holding company within Nordic Games Holding (later known as Nordic Games Group), as well as the parent company of Nordic Games GmbH. In April 2013, Nordic Games Licensing acquired several assets of bankrupt publisher THQ to be managed by Nordic Games GmbH.

In June 2014, Nordic Games Licensing acquired the "THQ" trademark, intending to use the name as a publishing label for its THQ properties. Subsequently, in August 2016, the company changed its name to THQ Nordic AB, while Nordic Games GmbH became THQ Nordic GmbH. According to Wingefors and THQ Nordic GmbH's Reinhard Pollice, the name change was undergone to capitalise on the good reputation of THQ's past, although they avoided naming the companies just "THQ" to avoid connections to THQ's more recent, troubled history being made.

Koch Media was set to operate independently under THQ Nordic, separate from THQ Nordic GmbH. To better reflect its holding function and to avoid confusion between THQ Nordic and its Viennese office, THQ Nordic stated that it planned to rename itself. In June 2018, the company issued 7.7 million new Class B shares to raise , which would be used for future acquisitions. Coffee Stain became THQ Nordic's "third leg", operating independently like Koch Media. In December 2018, gaming business website GamesIndustry.biz named Wingefors as one of their People of the Year 2018. In February 2019, THQ Nordic issued 11 million new Class B shares, raising .

Rebranding as Embracer Group and further acquisitions (2019–present)
GKGI held minority investments in five startup developers—Palindrome Interactive, Fall Damage, Neon Giant, Kavalri Games and Framebunker—as well as royalty rights to the THQ Nordic GmbH-published Biomutant. GKGI's investments in Bearded Dragons, Goodbye Kansas VR and IGDB were retained by its previous parent company, Goodbye Kansas. GKGI had been founded in 2016 and by the time of the acquisition had four full-time employees. To avoid further confusion with THQ Nordic GmbH and clarify its position as a holding company, THQ Nordic assumed the name "Embracer Group" at its annual general meeting on 17 September 2019, while the branch in Vienna retained its name. The deal included the studio's 65 employees and intellectual property, excluding Little Nightmares and The Stretchers, which remained with their respective owners.

GKGI was rebranded Amplifier Game Invest in January 2020 to better reflect its new ownership under Embracer Group. That same month, Amplifier opened River End Games, in Gothenburg, Sweden, and C77 Entertainment in Seattle, United States; two development studios, each with veterans from game studios of the respective areas. Embracer raised  in April 2020, to be used for future expansion.

Embracer Group announced seven acquisitions in August 2020: 4A Games and New World Interactive which will be under the Saber Interactive unit; Palindrome Interactive, Rare Earth Games and Vermila Studios which will be under Amplifier Game Invest; Pow Wow Entertainment which will be under THQ Nordic; and lastly DECA Games which became the sixth direct subsidiary under Embracer and will maintain autonomy under the deal. The group, under Koch Films, also acquired Sola Media, a Stuttgart-based television-and-film licensing group focusing on children and family properties. In November 2020, Embracer Group announced the acquisition of twelve companies: 34BigThings, Mad Head Games, Nimble Giant Entertainment, Snapshot Games and Zen Studios under Saber Interactive; A Thinking Ape Entertainment and IUGO Mobile Entertainment under the DECA Games unit; Flying Wild Hog under Koch Media; Purple Lamp Studios under THQ Nordic; Silent Games under Amplifier Game Invest; and lastly quality assurance company Quantic Lab under Embracer Group to support other studios within the company and public relations company Sandbox Strategies directly under Saber Interactive. THQ Nordic CEO Klemens Kreuzer stated that while large number of acquisitions were driven by the individual divisions under Embracer Group, the move represented part of the portfolio diversity of games that the company wanted to have, in contrast to larger publishers like Electronic Arts which have banked on only a few keystone titles.

The acquisitions were formally completed in April 2021.

The company began issuing additional stock in March 2021 to raise another  to strengthen its finances and continue its acquisition strategies. In May 2021, the company announced the acquisition of Appeal Studios, Kaiko, and Massive Miniteam under its THQ Nordic subsidiary, which has also established Gate 21 d.o.o. to enable the creation of "world-class 3D characters", as well as acquired Frame Break under its Amplifier Game Invest subsidiary. Massive Miniteam will be fully integrated within the HandyGames organisation, under the operative group THQ Nordic. Later that month, Embracer announced their intentions to build a huge games archive to "embrace the history of games."

Embracer acquired several more companies in the beginning of August 2021, including 3D Realms, Ghost Ship Games, Slipgate Ironworks, DigixArt, Force Field, Easy Trigger, CrazyLabs, and Grimfrost, under a combined  deal. On 18 August 2021, Embracer announced the acquisition of three more companies including Demiurge Studios, Fractured Byte and SmartPhone Labs, all of which will be made subsidiaries of Saber Interactive.

In December 2021, Embracer launched its intent to acquire Asmodee for €2.75 billion, as to incorporate it wholly as Embracer's ninth operational group and allowing Embracer to expand into the board game market. Once approved, Perfect World Entertainment would become part of the Gearbox division. It further acquired Dark Horse Media, the parent company for Dark Horse Comics and Dark Horse Entertainment, establishing Dark Horse as its tenth operating division. Additionally, the company acquired both Shiver Entertainment and Digic Pictures as part of the Saber group, and Spotfilm Networx, a German video-on-demand service, as part of Koch Media.

These include development studios Crystal Dynamics, Eidos-Montréal, Square Enix Montreal, and intellectual properties such as Tomb Raider, Deus Ex, Thief, Legacy of Kain, and more than 50 others, with the deal expected to be completed in the second quarter of Embracer's financial year. The acquisition was closed by August 26, 2022, with the assets being held under CDE Entertainment which is headed from a London office by Phil Rogers, former CEO of Square Enix Americas and Europe. On October 10, 2022, Square Enix Montréal rebranded as Onoma, but Embracer shuttered the studio and the group's QA team in November 2022 as part of a cost-cutting measure.

Additionally, in May 2022, the company established the Embracer Games Archive, a video game preservation effort, using its library of games as well as from other parties. The Archive was established physically in Karlstad, Sweden, with over 50,000 games already within it, and Embracer plans to eventually make parts of the archive available online for research purposes. The Savvy Gaming Group, an entity wholly owned by Saudi Arabia's Public Investment Fund, invested about  into Embracer in June 2022, amounting to about 8% of the company's ownership.

In August 2022, Amplifier Game Invest opened Infinite Mana Games, in Malmö, Sweden. Also within August, Embracer Group acquired Bitwave Games, Gioteck, Limited Run Games, Singtrix, Tatsujin Co. (which owns the intellectual properties to Toaplan games), Tripwire Interactive, and Tuxedo Labs, all to operate under the Freemode operating group, as well as the intellectual property rights to video games based on Lord of the Rings and the Hobbit intellectual properties by acquiring Middle-earth Enterprises.

Campfire Cabal was established by THQ Nordic in Copenhagen, Denmark in September 2022. Within October 2022, Embracer acquired Anime Limited in Glasgow, Scotland, to operate under the Plaion label, and acquired the VR Group within the Asmodee group. Embracer Group was approved to be listed on Nasdaq Stockholm in December 2022, transitioning from Nasdaq First North Growth Market to Nasdaq Stockholm on December 22, 2022.

On 4 January 2023, Gearbox Entertainment acquired Captured Dimensions, a Texas-based technology company specializing in 3D capture, scanning, and reconstruction services.

On 10 January 2023, Amplifier Game Invest opened Studio Hermitage in Raleigh, North Carolina with a goal of creating new IPs for a wide range of platforms and formats.

Subsidiaries 

As of August 2022, Embracer Group has 131 internal game development studios and is engaging more than 15,000 employees and contracted employees in more than 40 countries.

Video games

Computer and console games

Mobile games

Tabletop games

Entertainment and services

References

External links 
 

 
2016 initial public offerings
Companies based in Värmland County
Companies listed on Nasdaq Stockholm
Holding companies established in 2011
Holding companies of Sweden
Karlstad
Swedish companies established in 2011
Video game companies established in 2011
Video game companies of Sweden